Burt Grinstead (born 1988) is an American actor, producer, and writer. He is best known for Sebastian (2016), Eat with Me (2014), and The Lost Footage of Leah Sullivan (2016).

Early life

Grinstead was born in Boca Raton, Florida. He moved with his family to Bel Air, Maryland. He spent most of his childhood in the small town of Paxton, Massachusetts, where he attended Wachusett Regional High School and played football and lacrosse. As a child, his family spent some time living in Southern California. It was during that time that Grinstead began acting in commercials. He later trained as an actor at The American Academy of Dramatic Arts in New York City.

Career

Grinstead with his wife Anna Stromberg started a production company, Blanket Fort Entertainment. Together they have written, produced and starred in a feature film, The Lost Footage of Leah Sullivan and a theatrical adaptation of Robert Louis Stevenson's classic The Strange Case of Dr. Jekyll and Mr. Hyde, aptly named Dr. Jekyll & Mr. Hyde. 

Grinstead has guest starred and co-starred in television shows like Malibu Country, Criminal Minds, NCIS, The Mentalist, NCIS: Los Angeles, and 911. He has appeared in many movies and theatrical productions as well.

Filmography

Film

Television

Awards and nominations

References

External links
 

1988 births
21st-century American male actors
Male actors from Massachusetts
American male film actors
American male television actors
Living people
People from Boynton Beach, Florida
Male actors from Los Angeles
People from Boca Raton, Florida
People from Bel Air, Maryland
People from Paxton, Massachusetts